The Judo competition in the 1999 Summer Universiade were held in Palma de Mallorca, Spain.

Medal overview

Men's event

Women's event

Medals table

External links
 

Universiade
1999
1999 Summer Universiade
Judo competitions in Spain